Andrew Comiskey is an American conservative Christian political activist and is the founder of Desert Stream Ministries, a former ministry of Exodus International.  He has written several books based on his experience with avoiding homosexual relationships and behaviors, and gives seminars to those who wish to be free from such relationships and behaviors.  He is considered to be a prominent ex-gay leader, and has appeared as a guest on The 700 Club.

Biography

Comiskey started a support group for ex-gays at the Vineyard Santa Monica with the encouragement of the pastor. He started his own ex-gay organization called Desert Stream / Living Waters Ministries in 1980.  In 1981, Comiskey became a pastor in the Vineyard Christian Fellowship.  Later, Comiskey and Desert Stream would move and become part of Vineyard Anaheim, but this association finished when he moved to Kansas City.  In the following years, Comiskey continued his work as a pastor and leader of Desert Stream / Living Waters Ministries.  Comiskey cites author and ministry leader Leanne Payne as a major influence. Comiskey gives seminars on restoring whole relationships and avoiding homosexual relationships and behaviors and has written four books on the subject; Comiskey's Pursuing Sexual Wholeness became one of the most popular books on the topic.

Comiskey married Annette in 1981, with whom he had started the Desert Stream Ministries. The couple went on to have four children.

In April 2011, Comiskey converted to Roman Catholicism. This conversion was controversial among the Protestants that used his material.

Publications
 Freeing the Homosexual, Desert Stream Ministries, 1988, 
 Pursuing Sexual Wholeness: How Jesus Heals the Homosexual, Charisma House 1989, 
 Crosscurrent, Desert Stream Press, 1999, 
 The Kingdom of God & the Homosexual, Desert Stream Ministries, 2000, 
 Strength in Weakness: Overcoming Sexual and Relational Brokenness, InterVarsity press 2003,

Notes

References

External links
 Desert Stream Ministries
 Andy Comiskey's Blog

Year of birth missing (living people)
Living people
People self-identified as ex-gay
American Christian theologians
American Roman Catholics
Ex-gay movement